Stowe School is a public school (English fee-charging boarding and day school) for pupils aged 13–18 in Stowe, England. It opened on 11 May 1923, initially with 99 schoolboys, and with J. F. Roxburgh as the first headmaster. The school is a member of the 18 member Rugby Group, the Headmasters' and Headmistresses' Conference, and the G30 Schools' Group. Originally for boys only, the school is now coeducational, with some ~550 boys and ~300 girls, with 837 students enrolled in the school as of September 2021.

Stowe charges up to £38,853 a year, (£12,951 per term, three terms per academic year for 2022). However the school provides bursaries and other means of financial assistance to admitted students. A typical Scholarship at Stowe is worth 5% of the School Fee.

The school has been based since its beginnings at Stowe House, formerly the country seat of the Dukes of Buckingham and Chandos. Along with many of the other buildings on the school's estate, the main house is now a Grade I Listed Building and is maintained by the Stowe House Preservation Trust.

History

Stowe School opened in 1923. The main building is Stowe House, whose exterior was completed by 1779. Funding for the school came through the Rev. Percy Warrington and the Martyrs Memorial Trust. The school's first architect was Clough Williams-Ellis.

The first Headmaster was J. F. Roxburgh. He aimed to focus on the individual child and introduce them to beauty and learning; he wanted a civilised school founded on Christian values.

Today
The school's cricket ground is used as a first class ground by Northamptonshire CCC.

The Stowe Corner of Silverstone Circuit is named after the school.

A Southern Railway "Schools Class" steam locomotive, No. 928, which was built in 1934 was named after the school, and is preserved at the Bluebell Railway in East Sussex.

In 2016, a Daily Telegraph investigator posing as a parent of a Russian pupil was told by the then school registrar that while pupils would always be expected to pass the entrance exam, it would help secure a place if a borderline child's parents were able to donate "about £100,000 or something like that."

Boarding houses

There are 13 boarding houses: 8 boys' houses, 4 girls' houses and 1 mixed Sixth Form house. These boarding houses are mostly named after members of the family of Duke of Buckingham and Chandos. Each house has a number or letter assigned to it.

Headmasters
 1923–1949: J. F. Roxburgh
 1949–1958: Eric Reynolds
 1958–1964: Donald Crichton-Miller
 1964–1979: Robert Drayson
 1979–1989: Christopher Turner
 1989–2003: Jeremy Nichols
 2003–present: Anthony Wallersteiner

Notable former pupils

Former pupils of Stowe School are known as Old Stoics. Matthew Vaughn is currently the President of the Old Stoic Society.  Old Stoics include:

 Michael Alexander (1920–2004), prisoner of war
 Major Jack Anderson (1918–1943), recipient of Victoria Cross
 Lord Annan, (1916-2000), author and Provost of King's College, Cambridge
 3rd Earl Attlee, (born 1956), grandson of Clement Attlee
 George Barclay, (1920-1942), Battle of Britain pilot
 Alexander Bernstein, Baron Bernstein of Craigweil, (1936-2010), television executive, Labour Party member of the House of Lords
 Oliver Bertram, (1910-1975), motor racing driver
 Richard Boston, (1938-2006), English journalist and author
 John Boyd-Carpenter, Baron Boyd-Carpenter, British Conservative Party (1908-1998), politician
 Sir Richard Branson, (born 1950), businessman
 Lyndon Brook, (1926-2004), actor
 Jack Brooksbank, (born 1986), husband of Princess Eugenie
 Lord Brown of Eaton-under-Heywood, (born 1937), law lord
 Florence Brudenell-Bruce, (born 1985), actress and model
 Martin Buckmaster, 3rd Viscount Buckmaster (1921-2007)
 James Burnell-Nugent, (born 1949), Admiral
 Henry Cavill, (born 1983), actor
 Leonard Cheshire, VC (1917-1992), airman and founder of the Cheshire Foundation
 Oliver Churchill, (1914-1997), SOE officer during World War II
 Simon Clegg, (born 1959), former CEO of the British Olympic Association and former CEO of Ipswich Town Football Club
 Peter Coke, (1913-2008), playwright 
 Oliver Colvile, (born 1959), Conservative Member of Parliament
 John C. Corlette, (1911-1977), architect and later teacher at Gordonstoun, founder Aiglon College, Switzerland, in 1949
 John Cornford, (1915-1936), poet
 Andrew Croft, (1906-1998), explorer and SOE agent
 Chelsy Davy, (born 1985), former girlfriend of Prince Harry
 Michael Deeley, (born 1932), Academy Award-winning film producer
 Simon Digby, (1932-2010), oriental scholar
 Roly Drower, (1953-2008), poet, musician, satirist, broadcaster and activist
 Ben Duckett, (born 1994), English cricketer (Northamptonshire and Nottinghamshire). 
 John David Eaton, (1909-1973), Canadian merchant
 Hugh Dundas (1920–1995), RAF Wing Commander 
 John Dundas, (1915-1945), RAF Officer
 Alex Farquharson, Curator and Director of Tate Britain
 Thomas Firbank, originator of P company
 Gareth Forwood (1945–2007), British stage, film and television actor, only child of actors Glynis Johns and Anthony Forwood
 David Foster, British Royal Navy pilot and business executive
 Reg Gadney, (1941-2018), thriller-writer, painter and screenplay-writer
 Howard Goodall, (born 1958), musician
 Michael Grade, Baron Grade of Yarmouth (born 1943), TV executive
 Harry Gregson-Williams, (born 1961), composer and 1st music scholar 1975
 George Haig, 2nd Earl Haig (1918-2009)
 Edward Hardwicke, (1932-2011), actor
 Peter Hayman, (1914-1992), British diplomat and paedophile
 Sir Jack Hayward, (1923-2015), entrepreneur and former owner of Wolverhampton Wanderers
 Robert Heber-Percy (1911–1987), eccentric
 Sir Nicholas Henderson, (1919-2009), British diplomat
 Nigel Henderson, (1917-1985), artist, asked to leave after burning a Union Flag
 John Henniker-Major, 8th Baron Henniker, (1916-2004), British diplomat
 Annabel Heseltine, (born 1963), journalist and broadcaster
 Roger Hodgson, (born 1950), founding member and vocalist of Supertramp
 Oscar Humphries, (born 1981), journalist
 Robert Kee, (1919-2013), broadcaster, journalist and Ireland historian
 Danny Kinahan, (born 1958), Ulster Unionist Member of UK Parliament for South Antrim
 Adam King (born 1999), cricketer
 Marc Koska, (born 1961), designer K1 auto-disable syringe and credited with saving in excess of one million lives
 Laddie Lucas, (1915-1998), airman, golfer, author and Member of UK Parliament
 Nicholas Walter Lyell, Baron Lyell of Markyate, (1938-2010), former Solicitor-General and Attorney-General
George Parker, 8th Earl of Macclesfield (1914–1992)
 Gavin Maxwell, (1914-1969), author and naturalist
 Alistair McAlpine, Baron McAlpine (1942-2014), businessman, politician and author
 George Melly, (1926-2007), jazz singer and art historian
 Crispian Mills, (born 1973), musician
 Christopher Robin Milne, (1920-1996), bookseller and son of A. A. Milne
 George Monbiot (born 1963), journalist and political activist
 Iain Moncreiffe (1919-1985), herald
 Chandos Morgan (1920-1993), priest
 David Niven (1910-1983), actor and author
 Toby O'Brien (1909-1979), journalist and public relations expert
 Marilyn Okoro (born 1984), athlete
 Dalton Philips (born 1968), chief executive of Morrisons 
 Anthony Quinton (1925-2010), philosopher
 Rainier III, Prince of Monaco (1923-2005)
 Miranda Raison (born 1977), actress
 James Reeves (1909-1978), poet
 Graham Riddick (born 1955), Conservative Party politician
 Geoffrey Russell, 4th Baron Ampthill (1921-2011)
 John Sainsbury, Baron Sainsbury of Preston Candover (1927-2022), grocer
 David Shepherd, (1931-2017), artist
 Tilly Smith (born 1994), 2004 Indian Ocean earthquake tsunami rescuer
 David Stevens, Baron Stevens of Ludgate (born 1936), UKIP peer
 Henrik Takkenberg (1967-2006), singer and songwriter
 Karan Thapar, (born 1955), journalist
 Matthew Vaughn (born 1971), director and producer
 Michael Ventris (1922-1956), linguist who deciphered Linear B
 J. O. N. Vickers (1916-2008), trade unionist
 Rollo Weeks, (born 1987), businessman and actor
 Laurence Whistler, (1912-2000), artist
 Graeme White, (born 1987), cricketer, Northamptonshire
 Sir Nicholas Winton, (1909-2015),  humanitarian, nicknamed the British Schindler
 Sir Peregrine Worsthorne, (1923-2020), journalist
 David Wynne, (1926-2014), sculptor
 George Zambellas, (born 1958), Royal Navy Admiral

Notable masters
 Theodore Acland, housemaster 1924–30, later headmaster of Norwich School
 T.H. White, English Teacher 1932–36, known for his sequence of Arthurian novels, The Once and Future King, first published together in 1958.
 Harry Gregson-Williams, Composer in Residence 2012–13, Old Stoic and Hollywood composer.

Coat of Arms

Cricket ground

The first recorded match on the school cricket ground came in 1928 when Stowe School played St Paul's School. Buckinghamshire played their first Minor Counties Championship match there in 1947, when the opponents were Berkshire. Between 1947 and 1982 the ground held five Minor Counties Championship matches, the last of which saw Buckinghamshire draw against Bedfordshire. The ground has also hosted a single MCCA Knockout Trophy match which saw Buckinghamshire play Bedfordshire.

The ground has also held a single List A match for Northamptonshire in the 2005 totesport League, against Gloucestershire. and has held fourteen Second XI fixtures for the Northamptonshire Second XI in the Second XI Championship and Second XI Trophy.

See also
 List of schools in the South East of England
 List of independent schools in the United Kingdom
 List of boarding schools
 Aitchison College

Further reading
 Alasdair MacDonald, Stowe: House and School, London: W. S. Cowell, 1951

References

External links
 Stowe School Website
 Old Stoic Society
 Stowe House Preservation Trust
 Cricket ground record at cricinfo
 The Allied Schools
 Department for Education Performance Tables 2011
 Stowe School Ground at CricketArchive
 Stowe School Ground at Cricinfo

Member schools of the Headmasters' and Headmistresses' Conference
Private schools in Buckinghamshire
Cricket grounds in Buckinghamshire
Boarding schools in Buckinghamshire
Educational institutions established in 1923
 
Buckingham
1923 establishments in England